The Orange Heritage Trailway is a  rail trail in Orange County, New York, that runs along the roadbed of the Erie Railroad's Main Line from Monroe, NY to nearby Middletown.

History 

Between 1906 and 1909, the Erie Railroad constructed the Graham Line as a freight bypass around the congested Erie mainline between Harriman and Otisville, NY. In 1983, Conrail chose to abandon the mainline tracks in favor of the Graham Line, which is still used by Metro-North's Port Jervis Line and freight operator Norfolk Southern Railway. This longer route was the preferred route when local opposition to Metro-North caused the historically important Erie Main Line to be abandoned from Harriman to Middletown.

The former Erie Railroad mainline turns northwest at Newburgh Junction (Harriman) and tracks terminate at the site of the now-removed and demolished Nepera Chemical plant in the village of Harriman. The undeveloped roadbed continues approximately two miles through Harriman and Monroe. The paved trail begins in Harriman NY with an informal trailhead and parking lot located at the corner of River Rd. and North Main St.

There is a Norfolk Southern siding off the NYS&W mainline near Chester that runs along the rail trail for about 0.5 miles. This siding is all that remains of Greycourt, which was once the site of a sizeable railroad yard and an interchange point between the Erie Railroad and the L&HR. Greycourt is also where the Erie Railroad's Newburgh Branch split from the mainline.

The trail earned the designation of "National Recreation Trail" in June 2007.

Trail death
In 1999, Paul Harnisch, an assistant district attorney for Orange County, was charged with murder for striking two skaters, killing one of them, while driving illegally on the trail in the Chester area. Harnish drove for a half-mile with the dead skater on the hood of his vehicle.  He was found not guilty for reason of insanity and remanded to the custody of a psychiatric hospital for a period of years.

References

External links 
 Orange County Parks' Heritage Trail page
 Orange Heritage Trailway
 Official Map

Protected areas of Orange County, New York
Heritage trails
National Recreation Trails in New York (state)